No. 232 Squadron of the Royal Air Force was active in both World War I and World War II in a variety of roles, having seen action as an anti-submarine patrol, fighter and transport squadron.

History

In World War I
The squadron was formed on 20 August 1918 from No's 333, 334 and 335 Flights at Royal Naval Air Station RNAS Felixstowe and equipped with Felixstowe F.2 and Felixstowe F.3 flying boats. It carried out anti-submarine patrols over the North Sea until the end of the war. It disbanded on 5 January 1919 at Felixtowe.

In World War II

In Scotland
Reformed from 'B' Flight of No. 3 Squadron RAF at RAF Sumburgh on 17 July 1940 as a Hawker Hurricane unit, it remained in Scotland on defensive duties until April 1941, when it was earmarked for the Middle East. On 10 May its ground echelon was embarked but the aircrew were carrying out ferrying duties, consequently the ground echelon was disembarked and the squadron moved to RAF Ouston, where it continued its defensive role.

In the Far East
In November the squadron finally departed for the Middle East, but on arriving in South Africa, it was diverted to the Far East following the Japanese invasion of Malaya. Although the ground echelon arrived in Singapore, by the time the air echelon, aboard , was within flying off range, there were no airfields left in British hands, so the squadron flew off to Java on 27 January 1942. Both echelons met up again on 2 February at Palembang in Sumatra, but a further withdrawal to Java was required following the Japanese invasion of Sumatra. By mid February 1942, the situation regarding serviceability was so grave, that No 232 was merged with No 242 and its ground crews were evacuated to Ceylon. Here they were re-allocated to other units and No 232 ceased to exist on 26 February.

In North Africa and Italy
The squadron reformed at RAF Atcham on 10 April 1942 as a Spitfire unit becoming operational in May. In August it moved to RAF Debden, from where it flew offensive sweeps over France including operations supporting the Dieppe Raid, but in September it moved to RAF Turnhouse and began preparing for overseas deployment once again. Leaving the UK in November, the ground echelon arrived in Gibraltar, being joined by the aircrew and aircraft in December. It moved to North Africa in early December under the command of Archibald Winskill and immediately began undertaking ground attack and fighter operations in support of 1st Army, continuing this task until the end of the North African campaign.

In June 1943 the squadron moved to Malta to support the Allied invasion of Sicily before moving onto that island from where it supported the Allied landings on mainland Italy. In September it moved to airfields in Italy, but in December was re-allocated to the Lebanon for defensive duties. Re-equipped with Spitfire IXs, it moved to Corsica in April 1944 and took part in the Allied landing on the South Coast of France, remaining in France to support the Allied advance north until October 1944, when it returned to Naples and disbanded on 31 October.

As Transport squadron
The squadron reformed on 15 November 1944 at RAF Stoney Cross as a transport unit equipped with Wellington Mk.XVIs until 6 January 1945 when the aircraft were transferred to No 242 Squadron and the ground crews were used to form two other units, No. 243 Squadron RAF rear echelon and No. 1315 Flight RAF.  However, the squadron was not disbanded and it immediately received new aircraft, in the form of Liberators, and crews. These were taken to India in February where it immediately began carrying out transport flights throughout South-East Asia. In July some Douglas Skymaster Mk.Is were received and these were used to fly a Ceylon-Australia service until February 1946, when the Skymasters were returned to the UK, but the service was then resumed in March, the Skymasters having been replaced by Lancastrians. The squadron finally disbanded on 15 August 1946 at Poona, its routes being taken over by civilian airlines in the meantime.

References

Notes

Bibliography

 Halley, James J. The Squadrons of the Royal Air Force & Commonwealth 1918-1988. Tonbridge, Kent, UK: Air Britain (Historians) Ltd., 1988. .
 Jefford, C.G. RAF Squadrons, a Comprehensive Record of the Movement and Equipment of all RAF Squadrons and their Antecedents since 1912. Shrewsbury, Shropshire, UK: Airlife Publishing, 2001. .
 Rawlings, John D.R. Coastal, Support and Special Squadrons of the RAF and their Aircraft. London: Jane's Publishing Company Ltd., 1982. .
 Rawlings, John D.R. Fighter Squadrons of the RAF and their Aircraft. London: Macdonald and Jane's Publishers Ltd., 1969 (second edition 1976). .

External links

 232 Squadron Official history
 History of No.'s 231–235 Squadrons at RAF Web

Military units and formations established in 1918
232 Squadron
Battle of Britain
1918 establishments in the United Kingdom
Military units and formations in Mandatory Palestine in World War II
Military units and formations in British Malaya in World War II